This is a list of schools in the Metropolitan Borough of Knowsley in the English county of Merseyside.

State-funded schools

Primary schools

Blacklow Brow School, Huyton
Cronton CE Primary Academy, Cronton
Eastcroft Park School, Kirkby
Evelyn Community Primary School, Prescot
Halewood CE Primary Academy, Halewood
Halsnead Primary School, Whiston
Holy Family RC Primary School, Cronton
Holy Family RC Primary School, Halewood
Hope RC/CE Primary School, Huyton
Huyton With Roby CE Primary School, Huyton
Kirkby CE Primary School, Kirkby
Knowsley Lane Primary School, Huyton
Knowsley Village School, Knowsley
Malvern Primary School, Huyton
Millbrook Community Primary School, Westvale
Northwood Community Primary School, Kirkby
Our Lady's RC Primary School, Prescot
Park Brow Community Primary School, Kirkby
Park View Academy, Huyton
Plantation Primary School, Halewood
Prescot Primary School, Prescot
Ravenscroft Community Primary School, Kirkby
Roby Park Primary School, Huyton
St Aidan's RC Primary School, Huyton
St Albert's RC Primary School, Stockbridge Village
St Aloysius RC Primary School, Roby
St Andrew the Apostle RC Primary School, Halewood
St Anne's RC Primary School, Huyton
St Brigid's RC Primary School, Stockbridge Village
St Columba's RC Primary School, Huyton
St Gabriel's CE Primary School, Huyton
St John Fisher RC Primary School, Knowsley
St Joseph the Worker RC Primary School, Kirkby
St Joseph's RC Primary School, Huyton
St Laurence's RC Primary School, Kirkby
St Leo's and Southmead RC Primary School, Whiston
St Luke's RC Primary School, Prescot
St Margaret Mary's RC Infant School, Swanside
St Margaret Mary's RC Junior School, Swanside
St Marie's RC Primary School, Kirkby
St Mark's RC Primary School, Halewood
St Mary and St Paul's CE Primary School, Prescot
St Michael and All Angels RC Primary School, Kirkby
Ss Peter and Paul RC Primary School, Kirkby
Stockbridge Village Primary School, Stockbridge Village
Sylvester Primary Academy, Huyton
Westvale Primary School, Kirkby
Whiston Willis Primary Academy, Whiston
Willow Tree Primary School, Huyton
Yew Tree Primary Academy, Halewood

Secondary schools
All Saints Catholic High School, Kirkby
Halewood Academy, Halewood
Kirkby High School, Kirkby
Lord Derby Academy, Huyton
The Prescot School, Prescot
St Edmund Arrowsmith Catholic Academy, Whiston

Special and alternative schools
Alt Bridge School, Huyton
Bluebell Park School, Kirkby
Finch Woods Academy, Halewood
Knowsley Central School, Huyton
Meadow Park School, Stockbridge Village

Further education
Knowsley Community College

Independent schools

Special and alternative schools
ARTS Education, Huyton
Lawrence House School, Huyton
Peregrinate School, Westvale

Knowsley
Schools in the Metropolitan Borough of Knowsley